Osman López (born 30 July 1970) is a retired footballer from Colombia. He played as a central defender.

Career
López was most noted for his time playing for Millonarios de Bogotá, where he obtained the nickname "El Fosforito".

References

External links

1970 births
Living people
Colombian footballers
Colombia international footballers
Colombian expatriate footballers
Categoría Primera A players
Paraguayan Primera División players
Millonarios F.C. players
Deportes Tolima footballers
Cúcuta Deportivo footballers
Club Olimpia footballers
Expatriate footballers in Paraguay
Expatriate footballers in Venezuela
Association football defenders
20th-century Colombian people
21st-century Colombian people